Richard Christian Nelson (born 1961) is a portrait and gallery artist from Tryon, North Carolina. He has won numerous national awards and honors, and created over 1000 commissioned oil and charcoal portraits. He is also known for landscape and still life painting. Nelson maintains a studio in Asheville's River Arts District; 362 Depot.

Background
Born in Detroit, Michigan in 1961, Nelson earned his BFA at Detroit's College for Creative Studies in 1988. He is recognized nationally for his portrait work, and is an established landscape artist and instructor. He has served on the faculty of the Portrait Society Of America, is an active member of PAPSE (Plein Air Painters of the South East) and the Oil Painters Of America. A part of the Detroit music scene in the 1980s, Nelson is an accomplished rock musician. He was a member of notable Detroit bands Bitter Sweet Alley (BSA) and The Purple Gang. He played with Carolina bands the Trophy Husbands, Casual Zealots, and 176, and started the Rich Nelson Band in 2018.

Life and work
The Portrait Society of America has recognized Nelson's portrait work with fourteen awards. Among his notable commissions are portraits of former General Motors Chairmen John F. Smith, Jr. and Edward Whitacre, Jr., noted heart surgeon Randolph Chitwood, Medal of Honor recipient Bryant H. Womack, and Federal Judge Malcolm Jones Howard.

Awards
2019- 'Jim Jackson' Certificate Of Merit- Portrait Society Of America's International Portrait Competition
2017- 'Emelie' accepted into Oil Painters Of America Salon
2017- 'Jodie Karr' accepted into the Oil Painters of America Eastern Regional Exhibition*2017- ‘Emelie’ accepted into Oil Painters Of America Salon
2016- Granted signature status from the Portrait Society Of America
2016- 'Lily Outdoors' accepted into Oil Painters Of America National Juried Exhibition
2014 - Certificate Of Excellence - Portrait Society Of America's 2014 International Portrait Competition
2014- Certificate Of Excellence - Portrait Society Of America's 2014 International Portrait Competition
2013- Finalist - Portrait Society Of America's 2013 International Portrait Competition
2012- Certificate Of Excellence - Portrait Society Of America's 2012 International Portrait Competition
2012-  1st Place- Commissioned Portraits- Portrait Society Of America’s Member's Only Competition
2010- Finalist- Portrait/Figure Category of The Artist's Magazine 27th Annual Art Competition
2009-  1st Place- Oil and Honorable Mention-Drawing- Portrait Society Of America’s 'Choose Your Medium' Portrait Competition
2008 - 2nd Place- Portrait Society Of America’s ‘Outdoor’ Portrait Competition
2007 - Semifinalist In American Artist Magazine’s 70th Anniversary Competition
2007 - Honorable Mention - Portrait Society Of America’s Children’s Portrait Competition
2006 - Honorable Mention - Portrait Society Of America’s Self - Portrait Competition
2006 - 2nd Place and People’s Choice - Portrait Society Of America’s Tri - State Competition
2005 - Certificate Of Merit - Portrait Society Of America’s Annual Portrait Competition
2004 - Best Portfolio - Portrait Society Of America’s Annual Conference
2003 - Best Portfolio - Portrait Society Of America’s Annual Conference
2002 - Certificate of Merit - Portrait Society Of America’s Annual Portrait Competition
2001 - Certificate of Merit - Portrait Society Of America’s Annual Portrait Competition

References 

http://www.citizen-times.com/article/20130520/LIVING/305200007/WNC-portrait-artist-Nelson-wins-awards?nclick_check=1

http://www.portraitsociety.org/#!__members-only-competition/albumphotos1=24

^http://richardchristiannelson.com/ArticleDetail/1076

^http://richardchristiannelson.com/ArticleDetail/1034

^http://richardchristiannelson.com/ArticleDetail/1035

^http://richardchristiannelson.com/ArticleDetail/1050

External links 
 Personal Website
 Gallery
 Rich Nelson Band 

1961 births
Living people
Artists from Detroit
20th-century American painters
American male painters
21st-century American painters
21st-century American male artists
People from Tryon, North Carolina
20th-century American male artists